Matthew Thomas Lam (born 10 September 1989) is a Canadian professional soccer player who is currently a free agent.

Club career
Born in Edmonton, Alberta, Lam played youth soccer in the Netherlands for Ajax and in England for Sheffield United before making his professional debut for Croatian side Croatia Sesvete in October 2009. Lam returned to Canada to play for FC Edmonton in 2010, as the team prepared to join the North American Soccer League for the 2011 season. Lam left FC Edmonton in January 2011, moving on loan to Japanese team JEF United Chiba.

Lam earned one cap for Canada U20 in November 2008.

On 27 February 2013, Lam joined Hong Kong First Division side Kitchee, signing an initial 18-month contract.

On 10 January 2018, fellow Hong Kong Premier League club Lee Man acquired Lam on loan for the remainder of the season.

On 25 May 2019, it was announced that Lam would be leaving the club after six years. 

On 19 June 2019, R&F head coach Yeung Ching Kwong revealed that Lam would join the club. He opened his account for the club on 22 December 2019, scoring a brace in a 7–1 win over Rangers. Lam sued the club in November 2020 due to unpaid wages.

On 3 May 2021, it was announced that Lam would join Southern until the end of the season.

On 9 August 2021, it was announced that Lam had joined Eastern.

On 19 June 2022, it was announced that Lam had left Eastern.

Personal life
His father is Hongkongese and his mother is Canadian of Dutch descent. His brother, Sam Lam, is also a professional soccer player.

References

External links
 
 

1989 births
Living people
Canada men's youth international soccer players
Canadian expatriate soccer players
Canadian expatriate sportspeople in Croatia
Canadian expatriate sportspeople in Japan
Canadian expatriates in Japan
Canadian expatriates in the Netherlands
Canadian people of Dutch descent
Canadian people of Hong Kong descent
Canadian soccer players
Hong Kong people of Canadian descent
Hong Kong people of Dutch descent
Expatriate footballers in Croatia
Expatriate footballers in Japan
Expatriate footballers in the Netherlands
Expatriate footballers in England
FC Edmonton players
Hong Kong First Division League players
Hong Kong Premier League players
J2 League players
JEF United Chiba players
Kitchee SC players
Lee Man FC players
R&F (Hong Kong) players
Southern District FC players
Eastern Sports Club footballers
NK Croatia Sesvete players
North American Soccer League players
Croatian Football League players
Sheffield United F.C. players
Soccer players from Edmonton
Association football midfielders
Canadian expatriate sportspeople in England